Gnarr is a 2010 Icelandic documentary film directed by Gaukur Úlfarsson. The film follows the political campaign of Jón Gnarr, a former punk rocker with no background in politics that formed his own party – the Best Party – and became the mayor of Reykjavík.

Cast
 Jón Gnarr as Gnarr

References

External links
 
 
 

2010 films
2010 documentary films
Icelandic documentary films
2010s Icelandic-language films
Politics of Reykjavík
Documentary films about elections
Documentary films about punk music and musicians